Hamilton County State Fish and Wildlife Area is an Illinois state park on  in Hamilton County, Illinois, United States.

References

State parks of Illinois
Protected areas of Hamilton County, Illinois
Protected areas established in 1962
1962 establishments in Illinois